Observatorio is a station on Line 1 of the Mexico City Metro system. It is located in the Álvaro Obregón borough of Mexico City, west of the city centre. This station is the western terminus of Line 1. In 2019, the station had an average ridership of 72,296 passengers per day, making it the eighth busiest station in the network. The station will become the terminal station of Line 12 in December 2023. The station will also connect with Observatorio railway station of the Toluca-Mexico City commuter rail system.

Name and iconography
The station logo represents the stylised dome of an astronomical observatory.  It is named after an observatory that was built by the Universidad Nacional Autónoma de México at the top of a hill near the station. However, due to the light pollution that came as a consequence of urban growth hardly any observations were done in the observatory, and thus it was transformed into a planetarium. Previously on the site was a colonial palace that belonged to the city's Bishop.

General information
This station is one of the most important metro terminus in the city. It serves Mexico City's western bus depot, which connects with areas of western Mexico such as México state, Michoacán, Jalisco, Querétaro and others.

The Observatorio Mexico City Metro station is the 1st station of Line 1 and the Mexico City Metro system. Service at this station began June 10, 1972. This Mexico City Metro train station is underground.  The trains take passengers to Tacubaya, Juanacatlán, Chapultepec, Sevilla, Insurgentes, Cuáuhtemoc, Balderas, Salto del Agua, Isabel la Catolica, Pino Suárez, Merced, Candelaria, San Lazaro, Moctezuma, Balbuena, Boulevard Puerto Aéreo, Gómez Farías, Zaragoza, and Pantitlán Mexico City Metro stations.

Originally Line 9 had its plans to end here, even pictograms in Line 1 showed this station as a transfer station for Line 9. But for an unknown reason the station was not built and the Line 9 finished at Tacubaya.

In 2017, Toluca-Mexico City commuter rail started test trains and will enter full service by 2022.

Ridership

Future
Observatorio will be the eastern terminus for Toluca–Mexico City commuter rail when the line commences regular service, projected to begin its service in 2022.

As of March 2021, an extension of Line 12 to Observatorio is under construction, which will connect it with Line 1. The new Line 12 station is expected to open by 2021.

As of 2018, the connection from Line 9 Tacubaya station towards Observatorio is planned, but a completion date has not been announced. This would make Observatorio, together with Tacubaya, Chabacano and Pantitlán, the only transfer stations in the Mexico City Metro network to have connections with three lines, in this case Line 1, Line 9 and Line 12.

In October 2020, Mexico City's government announced a project to renovate the Observatorio area and to build a terminal that will allow users to transfer between metro, commuter rail and other public transportation services. It has been projected to be used by a million people every day and will be the most important complex of this type in Latin America. Works are expected to be finished by the end of 2022.

Exits
Northeast: Av. Minas de Arena, Col. Pino Suárez
Northwest: Av. Minas de Arena, Col. Pino Suárez
Southeast: Real del Monte street, Col. Pino Suárez
Southwest: Real del Monte street, Col. Pino Suárez

Gallery

See also
 List of Mexico City metro stations

References

External links

Mexico City Metro stations in Álvaro Obregón, Mexico City
Railway stations opened in 1972
1972 establishments in Mexico
Observatorio
Mexico City Metro Line 12 stations
Accessible Mexico City Metro stations